Franquelin may refer to:

Surname 
 Jean-Augustin Franquelin (1798–1839), French painter
 Jean-Baptiste-Louis Franquelin (1650–1712), French cartographer and hydrographer

Toponyms 
 Franquelin, Quebec, a municipality in Manicouagan Regional County Municipality, Côte-Nord, Quebec, Canada
 Franquelin River, Franquelin, Quebec, Canada
 Rivière Franquelin Branche Ouest, Franquelin, Quebec, Canada
 Franquelin Lake, Rivière-aux-Outardes, Quebec, Canada

See also
Franklin (disambiguation)